Tanya Preminger, is an artist working in various media: environmental art, site-specific art, ephemeral art, sculpture, installation and photography. She is mostly known for her land art projects and large-scale stone sculptures.

Her diverse body of work has been displayed internationally in numerous exhibitions and symposiums.

Biography

Tanya Preminger Novozilova was born in Taganrog, Russia. Her father was Nikolay Novozilov, a scientist and winner of the Lenin award, and her mother was Inna Prochaska, an engineer and a lecturer at the Frunze Military Academy in Moscow.

Tanya earned a Master of Arts (M.A.) degree from the Surikov Academy of Fine Arts, Moscow, Russia.

She married Osip Preminger, and the couple has 4 daughters. Since 1972 she lives, works and teaches in Israel.

Preminger works mainly in natural materials. Her early sculptures were done from clay, wood, and stone, and later she begun including earth, grass, water, snow and other materials.

Tanya has presented dozens of solo exhibitions in Israel in various venues, including : The Negev Museum, Open Museum Omer, Ramat Gan Museum, Herzliya Museum of Contemporary Art, Lutshansky Museum, Painters and Sculptors Association Gallery, Tova Osman Gallery, Jerusalem Artists House, and Efrat Gallery.

Preminger has participated in over 240 symposiums, competitions and group exhibitions worldwide.

Her monumental works and environmental projects are installed in more than 38 countries around the world.

In 2008 Preminger founded the “Green Gallery”- an open-air gallery for Land Art in Arsuf Kedem, Israel.

Awards

Grants
2013 Grant of “Artist” for Setouchi Trienale, Japan.
2009 Artist Residence grant, Pedvale Open Air Museum, Latvia.
2002 Artist-in-residence grant. University of Houston, Texas, USA.
1991 Artist-in-residence grant. Bemis Center for Contemporary Arts, Omaha, USA.

Selected works

Selected symposiums, competitions and exhibitions

2020 “Corona in the Green Gallery” Exhibition. Green Gallery - open air gallery for Environmental Art. Israel.

2020 International Stone Sculpture symposium. Ganey Tikva. Israel.

2020 Galkot International Sculpture Symposium. Baglung. Nepal.

2019 The 3rd “Spoonbill Cup” Public Art Exhibition, China.

2019  ”The Marble Mile Festival”, Poleskoi, Ural, Russia.

2018  “China Tongchuan Xuanzang Road” international sculpture symposium. Tongchuan. China.

2018  FAD, El Primero Simposio Internacional de Esculturea. University of Mendoza. Argentina.

2018  International Stone Sculpture symposium .Maalot-Tarshiha. Israel.

2017  “Winners of Ministry of Culture Prize Exhibition”, MOBY Museum, Bat Yam, Israel.

2017  The 7th Beijing International Art Biennale, National Art Museum of China. China.

2017  International Land Art Residency, Narrative Movements Komdhara, Hooghly, India.

2016  “Bienal Internacional de Escultura Competition”, Resistencia. Argentina.

2015  "Center of point is on the side". The sixth Moscow Biennale of Contemporary Art, Moscow.

2013   “Setouchi Trienale”, International Exhibition. Sakaide. Japan.

2012  "Hidden Cities" International ArtExpo, Koza Art Association, Istanbul, Turkey.

2011  "Sea art festival" Busan Biennale, Busan, Korea.

2011  “100 years of Tsinghua University”  International Exhibition . Beijing, China.

2009  “Ritual Cut” project. Artist Residence grant, Pedvale Open Air Art Museum,  Latvia.

2009  "Horizons Rencontre Art Nature"  International Exhibition, Massif du Sancy, France.

2008  "La Piera Musa Agresti" Prize, Cultural Center Domo Dorossa, Italy.

2003  Fuzhow International Sculpture Exhibition. Fuzhow, China.

1995   International Female Biennale. Stockholm, Sweden.

1991 "Israel Contemporary Sculpture". Museum HRA, Japan.

1988 "40 from Israel". Brooklyn Museum, New York, USA.

References

 Art on Wry / Anne Marie Champagne
 Information Center of Israeli Art in The "Israel Museum"
 The Art Project

Israeli Ministry of Education. Assignment for students about “Aliya”.

External links
 Tanya Preminger -  
 Green Gallery

Israeli sculptors
Living people
Israeli women sculptors
20th-century Israeli women artists
21st-century Israeli women artists
Land artists
Environmental art
1944 births